Jasnagurka (formerly  'clear hill') is a village in Kėdainiai district municipality, in Kaunas County, in central Lithuania. According to the 2011 census, the village was uninhabited. There are stone stall, lime tree alley and barn left from the former Jasnagurka manor (a culture heritage object).

At the beginning of the 20th century Jasnagurka was a landed property of Kampai Klementai and Paliepiai estates.

Demography

References

Villages in Kaunas County
Kėdainiai District Municipality